Arantza Moreno Fernández (born 16 January 1995) is a Spanish athlete specialising in the javelin throw. She won a silver medal at the 2018 Ibero-American Championships.

Her personal best in the event is 59.69 metres set in Castellón in 2018.

International competitions

References

1995 births
Living people
Spanish female javelin throwers
People from Ermua
Sportspeople from Biscay
Spanish Athletics Championships winners
Athletes from the Basque Country (autonomous community)